5 Star Grave is an Italian heavy metal band which formed in 2005 and currently signed to Sliptrick Records. As of 2017, they have released three albums, one EP and one single.

History 

5 Star Grave was founded by Thierry Bertone and Gabriele Lingua in 2005. In a couple of months Alessandro Blengino, Hervè De Zulian, Claudio Ravinale (Disarmonia Mundi) and Andrea Minolfi joined the band. 
The first name of the band was Ground Zero and with this name an EP was recorded in 2006: The Zero Hour.
In 2007 the band changed the name and became 5 Star Grave and in 2008 the band recorded Corpse Breed Syndrome, their first full-length album (self produced).
In 2010 the band paid homage to The Ramones, releasing for free a version of their track, Pet Sematary.
In the beginning of 2011 the band recorded their second full length album, named Drugstore Hell. The album was mixed by Tobias Lindell and mastered by Dragan Tanaskovic at the Bohus Sound Studios in Gothenburg, Sweden.
In October 2011 the band were signed by Massacre Records and Drugstore Hell was released on May 25, 2012.
The album combines "extreme vocal aggression with catchy light-hearted melodies, a pounding rhythm section mixed with industrial keyboards and a sharp guitar work, all merged together in a boiling high-octane cauldron".

In September 2017 the band released The Red Room for Sliptrick Records.

Members

Current members 
Claudio Ravinale - vocals (2005–present)
Andrea Minolfi - bass and vocals (2005–present)
Thierry Bertone - guitars (2005–present)
Alessandro Blengino - guitars (2005–present)
Hervè De Zulian - synth (2005–present)
Domenico Fazzari - drums (2015–present)

Former Member 
Roberto Gaia - drums (2012 - 2015)
Gabriele Lingua - drums (2005 - 2012)

Discography

Studio albums 

Corpse Breed Syndrome (self-produced, 2008)
Drugstore Hell (Massacre Records, 2012)
The Red Room (Sliptrick Records, 2017)

EPs 

The ZERO Hour (self-produced, 2006, still under the name Ground Zero)

Singles 

Pet Sematary (self-produced, 2010)

References

External links 
 Official website
 5 Star Grave on Facebook

Massacre Records artists